Julio Daniel Ferreyra (born 1 July 1942) is an Argentine politician, currently serving as National Deputy representing Jujuy Province. A member of the Justicialist Party, Ferreyra was Director of the Jujuy Civil Registry for twenty years, from 1999, until being elected to Congress in 2019. He currently sits in the Frente de Todos parliamentary bloc.

As of 2021, he is the oldest serving member of the Chamber of Deputies.

Early and personal life
Ferreyra was born on 1 July 1942 in San José de Metán, Salta Province. He is married and has three children, including one daughter.

Political career
Ferreyra was elected to the City Council of Palpalá, Jujuy Province, in 1983. He ran for the Movimiento Popular Jujeño (MPJ), a regionalist party. Later, in 1999, he was appointed Director of the Jujuy Civil Registry by Governor Eduardo Fellner. He would serve in the position for the following twenty years, being renewed by the administrations of Walter Barrionuevo and Gerardo Morales.

Ferreyra was the Justicialist Party's nominee to compete in the 2019 gubernatorial election in Jujuy; he faced off the Radical Civic Union–Cambiemos's candidate, incumbent governor Morales. Ferreyra did not count with the full support of the Justicialist Party, however, as a splinter faction supported the candidacy of Senator Guillermo Snopek. Ferreyra received 32.97% of the popular vote, losing against Morales' 43.76%.

National Deputy
Ahead of the 2019 legislative election, Ferreyra was nominated, alongside Carolina Moisés, to run for Jujuy's seats in the Argentine Chamber of Deputies, as part of the Frente de Todos list. Ferreyra was the second candidate in the list, behind Moisés. The Frente de Todos list was the most voted in the province, with 45.40% of the votes, and both Moisés and Ferreyra were elected. 

As national deputy, Ferreyra formed part of the parliamentary commissions on Pensions and Social Security, Maritime Interests, Cooperative Affairs and NGOs, Analysis of Tax Norms, Social Action and Public Health, and Transport. Ferreyra caused controversy in 2020 when, during the debate on the Voluntary Interruption of Pregnancy bill (which legalized abortion in Argentina), he claimed he and his daughter were receiving threats for his intention to vote in favour of the bill. In the end, he abstained from the vote, becoming the only abstention in the vote.

References

External links
Profile on the official website of the Chamber of Deputies (in Spanish)

Living people
1942 births
People from Salta Province
People from Jujuy Province
Members of the Argentine Chamber of Deputies elected in Jujuy
Justicialist Party politicians
20th-century Argentine politicians
21st-century Argentine politicians